Ervīns Muštukovs (born 7 April 1984) is a Latvian professional ice hockey goaltender. He plays for HC RT Torax Poruba in the Czech2.

Career
He has played for Drummondville Voltigeurs in the QMJHL, the Knoxville Ice Bears in the SPHL, the Toledo Storm and the Elmira Jackals in the ECHL. He has played for Dinamo Riga in the Kontinental Hockey League. He was also a backup for the Latvian National Team at the 2010 Winter Olympic Hockey Tournament. He signed to play for the Sheffield Steelers of the United Kingdom's Elite Ice Hockey League in 2010–2011, where his performances helped the team win the Elite League Title again. He was also a part of the Elite League Select team that played the Boston Bruins in an exhibition game at the Odyssey Arena in Belfast. After a superb season in Sheffield, where he broke the record for the most number of shutouts in a season, Ervins decided to move on and has signed for the Odense Bulldogs of the Danish Ice Hockey League for the 2011–12 season.

Ervins rejoined the Sheffield Steelers for the 2016–17 season, departing for a second time in 2018. He has since had spells in France with Nice hockey Côte d'Azur and Scorpions de Mulhouse, before returning to Latvia to sign for Olimp Riga.

Achievements
 Latvian League Top Goalie 02/03
 QMJHL Player of the Week (16 Nov) 03/04
 SPHL Player of the Week 06/07
 ECHL Player of the Week (31 Jan) 06/07
 EIHL Player of the Month (September) 10/11
 EIHL Player of the Week (x2) 10/11
 EIHL Most Shutouts in a Season 10/11
 EIHL First All-Star Team 10/11
 EIHL Champion Sheffield Steelers 10/11
 EIHL Best SVS % (92.2) 10/11
 EIHL Most wins (46) 10/11
 EIHL Best Goalie award 10/11
 EIHL Play-Off Champion Sheffield Steelers 16/17
 EIHL Best SVS % (.913) 16/17
 EIHL Player of the Week (x2) 17/18

References

External links
 
 
 

1984 births
Living people
Dinamo Riga players
Ice hockey players at the 2010 Winter Olympics
Ice hockey players at the 2014 Winter Olympics
Knoxville Ice Bears (SPHL) players
Latvian ice hockey goaltenders
Latvian expatriates in England
Les Aigles de Nice players
Olympic ice hockey players of Latvia
Ice hockey people from Riga
Sheffield Steelers players
Drummondville Voltigeurs players
Toledo Storm players
Elmira Jackals (ECHL) players
Scorpions de Mulhouse players